Lyoathelia is a fungal genus  in the family Atheliaceae. The genus is monotypic, containing the single corticioid (crust-like) species Lyoathelia laxa. Originally found in Canada, it is now known to occur as well in the United States and Japan.

References

External links
 

Atheliales
Monotypic Basidiomycota genera
Taxa named by Leif Ryvarden